Country music is a blend of popular musical forms originally found in the Southern United States and the Appalachian Mountains. The term also includes Western music (North America) which had similar origins in the Western United States and Rocky Mountains.

Country Music may also refer to:
 Country Music (magazine), a bi-monthly magazine on country music
 Country Music (miniseries), 2019

Albums
 Country Music (Willie Nelson album), 2010
 Country Music (Marty Stuart album), 2003
 Country Music, an album by Flatt and Scruggs

See also
Australian country music
Christian country music
List of country genres